Echinotermes, is a genus of soldierless termites belonging to the family Termitidae, containing a single species, Echinotermes biriba, which is endemic to Colombia.

Description
Worker is monomorphic. Light yellowish Head capsule and antennae present. Pronotum pale yellow. Legs are hyaline. Fore-tibia moderately inflated. Digestive tube composed with a very large crop. Mesenteron forms a complete 360° loop.

References

Termite genera
Insects described in 2018
Monotypic insect genera